Green Book may refer to:

Film
 Green Book (film), a 2018 drama film, directed by Peter Farrelly
 The Green Book: Guide to Freedom, a 2019 documentary by Yoruba Richen

Literature

Fiction
 Green Book, the title of the main section in Arthur Machen's short story "The White People" 
 The Green Book, an off-Broadway play by Will Scheffer
 The Green Book, a children's book by Jill Paton Walsh

Non-fiction
 Green Book (CD-interactive standard)
 Green Book (Tibetan document), a document issued by the Central Tibetan Administration to Tibetans living outside Tibet
 Green Book, an 1800–1833 assembled ship's register of Lloyd's Register
 A Policy on Geometric Design of Highways and Streets, or The Green Book, a publication by the American Association of State Highway and Transportation Officials on roadway and street engineering design
 Green Books, the multi-volume Official History of the United States Army in World War II
 Quantities, Units and Symbols in Physical Chemistry, also called the "IUPAC Green Book", a compilation of terms and symbols widely used in the field of physical chemistry
 The Green Book (BBC) or BBC Variety Programmes Policy Guide For Writers and Producers
 The Green Book (IRA), an Irish Republican Army training manual
 The Green Book (Muammar Gaddafi), a book setting out the political philosophy of Muammar Gaddafi
 The Green Book, UK Treasury guidance on appraisal and evaluation of central government projects
 The Green Book: A Guide to Members' Allowances, a publication of the House of Commons of the United Kingdom
 The Green Book Magazine, an American theater and women's interest magazine in the early 20th century
 The Little Green Book, a collection of fatwa issued by Ayatollah Ruhollah Khomeini
 The Negro Motorist Green Book, a 1936–1966 segregation-era travel guide originally published by Victor H. Green
 The Land and the Nation, known as The Green Book, a 1925 British Liberal Party publication; see

Other uses
 The Green Book (album), a 2003 album by Twiztid

See also
 Greenbook, a publication of the Federal Reserve Board with projections for the economy of the United States
 Green Booklet, or Word list of the Dutch language
 Green paper, a tentative government report of a proposal
 The Green Fairy Book (1892), a book by Andrew Lang